The Committee on the Appeal for Human Rights (COAHR) was a group of Atlanta University Center students formed in February 1960.  The committee drafted and published An Appeal for Human Rights on March 9, 1960. Six days after publication of the document, students in Atlanta united to start the Atlanta Student Movement and initiated the Atlanta sit-ins in order to demand racial desegregation as part of the Civil Rights Movement. Early members of the group include, among others, Lonnie King, Julian Bond, Herschelle Sullivan, Carolyn Long, Joseph Pierce.

References 

Civil rights movement
Community organizations
Nonviolent resistance movements
Defunct American political movements
1960 establishments in Georgia (U.S. state)
1960s in the United States